The American Broadcasting Company (ABC) is a commercial broadcasting television network owned by Walt Disney Television, a subsidiary of The Walt Disney Company. Headquartered on Ninth Avenue and West 66th Street in Manhattan, ABC is the fifth-oldest major broadcasting network in the world. The network began its TV operations in 1948.

Current programming

Note: Titles are listed in order followed by the year of debut in parentheses.

Dramas
Grey's Anatomy (2005)
The Good Doctor (2017)
Station 19 (2018)
A Million Little Things (2018)
The Rookie (2018)
Big Sky (2020)
The Rookie: Feds (2022)
Alaska Daily (2022)
Will Trent (2023)
The Company You Keep (2023)

Comedies
The Goldbergs (2013)
The Conners (2018)
Home Economics (2021)
The Wonder Years (2021)
Abbott Elementary (2021)
Not Dead Yet (2023)

Docuseries
Superstar (2021)

Reality/non-scripted
America's Funniest Home Videos (1989 as a special; 1990)
The Bachelor (2002)
The Bachelorette (2003–05; 2008)
Shark Tank (2009)
The Great Christmas Light Fight (2013)
Bachelor in Paradise (2014)
American Idol (2018)
Holey Moley (2019)
Judge Steve Harvey (2022)
Who Do You Believe? (2022)
Claim to Fame (2022)
The Parent Test (2022)

Specials
 Santa Claus Is Comin' to Town (1970)
 Dick Clark's New Year's Rockin' Eve (1974)
 Disney Parks Christmas Day Parade (1983)
 CMA Music Festival (2004)
 Shrek the Halls (2007)
 Prep & Landing (2009)
 CMA Country Christmas (2010)
 Prep & Landing: Naughty vs. Nice (2011)
 Toy Story of Terror! (2013)
 Toy Story That Time Forgot (2014)
 The Wonderful World of Disney: Magical Holiday Celebration (2016)
 Olaf's Frozen Adventure (2017)
 A Very Boy Band Holiday (2021)

Game shows
Celebrity Family Feud (2015)
To Tell the Truth (2016)
The $100,000 Pyramid (2016)
Press Your Luck (2019)
Celebrity Wheel of Fortune (2021)
The Chase (2021)
Generation Gap (2022)
The Final Straw (2022)
Celebrity Jeopardy! (2022)

Soap operas
 General Hospital (1963)

Awards shows
American Music Awards (1973)
Academy Awards (1976)
Country Music Association Awards (2006)
ESPY Awards (2015)

Talk shows
The View (1997)
GMA3: What You Need To Know (2018)

Late night shows
Jimmy Kimmel Live! (2003)

News

ABC World News Tonight (1953)
Good Morning America (1975)
20/20 (1978)
Nightline (1980)
This Week (1981)
America This Morning (1982)
World News Now (1992)

Saturday morning
 
Jack Hanna's Wild Countdown (2011)
Outback Adventures with Tim Faulkner (2014–15; 2016)
Rock the Park (2015)
Ocean Treks with Jeff Corwin (2016)
Oh Baby! with Anji Corley (2019)

Film presentations
The Ten Commandments (1973; 2000)
The Sound of Music (2002)
ABC Saturday Movie of the Week (2004)

ESPN programming

Professional football:
National Football League (NFL)
Monday Night Football (shared with ESPN)
Wild Card Playoffs (simulcast on ESPN)
Pro Bowl (simulcast on ESPN)
Super Bowl (in rotation with NBC, CBS, and Fox - simulcast on ESPN)
National Football League Draft (simulcast on ESPN)
XFL (2020)
Professional basketball:
National Basketball Association (NBA) coverage, including:
NBA Countdown
NBA Christmas Special
NBA Saturday Primetime
NBA Sunday Showcase
Select NBA playoffs games
The NBA Finals
Women's National Basketball Association (WNBA) coverage
Professional ice hockey:
National Hockey League (NHL)
NHL All-Star Game
Stanley Cup Playoffs
Stanley Cup Finals
College football:
ESPN College Football on ABC, which includes:
Saturday Night Football
Saturday afternoon games featuring teams from the ACC, Big 12 and Pac-12
Select bowl games alternated with ESPN
Tennis:
The Championships, Wimbledon
Ladies' and Gentlemen's Singles Finals (same-day replay, live coverage on ESPN)
Indian Wells Masters
Auto racing:
Formula One
Esports:
Overwatch League
Misc:
The X Games (Summer and Winter)
The Little League World Series

Upcoming programming

Game shows
Jeopardy! Masters (TBA)

Reality/non-scripted
The Prank Panel (2023)

Pilots

Dramas
The Good Lawyer
The Hurt Unit
Judgement
Untitled series based on HIP

Comedies
Drop-Off
Public Defenders

In development

Dramas
The Front Line
Untitled Alexi Hawley project
Untitled Ally McBeal sequel

Comedies
Boss
Forgive and Forget
Lately
Moore & More
Outer Calistoga
Overtime
Untitled Muslim-American comedy
Worst House on the Block

Former programming

Action-adventure

Docuseries

Dramas
10-8: Officers on Duty (2003–04)
12 O'Clock High (1964–67)
240-Robert (1979–81)
666 Park Avenue (2012–13)
77 Sunset Strip (1958–64)
American Crime (2015–17)
The Asphalt Jungle (1961)
The Avengers (1966–69)
B.A.D. Cats (1980)
B.L. Stryker (1989–90)
The Baker and the Beauty (2020)
Barbary Coast (1975–76)
Baretta (1975–78)
Ben Casey (1961–66)
Bert D'Angelo/Superstar (1976)
Betrayal (2013–14)
Big Shots (2007–08)
Black Box (2014)
Blind Justice (2005)
Blood & Oil (2015)
Blue Light (1966)
Body of Proof (2011–13)
Boston Legal (2004–08)
Bourbon Street Beat (1959–60)
Brothers & Sisters (2006–11)
Buck James (1987–88)
Burke's Law (1963–66)
Bus Stop (1961–62)
The Byrds of Paradise (1993–94)
Call to Glory (1984–85)
Capital News (1990)
Caribe (1975)
Casablanca (1955–56)
Cashmere Mafia (2008)
Castle (2009–16)
The Catch (2016–17)
Charlie Grace (1995)
Charlie's Angels (1976–1981)
Charlie's Angels (2011)
China Beach (1988–91)
Civil Wars (1991–93)
Code Red (1981–82)
The Colbys (1985–87)
Columbo (1989–2003)
Combat! (1962–67)
Commander in Chief (2005–06)
The Commish (1991–1996)
Conviction (2016–17)
Cop Rock (1990)
The Court (2002)
Court Martial (1966)
Covington Cross (1992)
Crime with Father (1951–52)
Crossroads (1992–93)
Cupid (1998–99)
Cupid (2009)
Dan August (1970–71)
Dangerous Minds (1996–1997)
Darkroom (1981–82)
Day Break (2006)
The Days (2004)
Deception (2018)
The Deep End (2010)
Designated Survivor (2016–18; moved to Netflix)
Desperate Housewives (2004–12)
Detroit 1-8-7 (2010–11)
Dirty Sexy Money (2007–09)
Doc Elliot (1973–74)
Doogie Howser, M.D. (1989–93)
Dynasty (1981–89)
Eastwick (2009)
Eight Is Enough (1977–81)
Eli Stone (2008–09)
Elvis (1990)
Emergence (2019–20)
Equal Justice (1990–91)
The Evidence (2006)
Eyes (2005)
The F.B.I. (1965–74)
Family (1976–80)
The Family (2016)
Fantasy Island (1977–84)
Fantasy Island (1998–99)
FBI: The Untold Stories (1991–93)
The Feather and Father Gang (1976–77)
Felony Squad (1966–69)
Finder of Lost Loves (1984–85)
A Fine Romance (1989)
The Fix (2019)
FlashForward (2009–10)
Follow the Sun (1961–62)
For Life (2020–21)
For the People (2018–19)
Forever (2014–15)
The Forgotten (2009–10)
The Fugitive (1963–67)
Gabriel's Fire (1990–91)
The Gallant Men (1962–63)
The Gates (2010)
GCB (2012)
Get Christie Love! (1974–75)
Gideon's Crossing (2000–01)
Glitter (1984)
Grand Hotel (2019)
The Greatest American Hero (1981–83)
Griff (1973–74)
Happy Town (2010)
Hardcastle and McCormick (1983–86)
The Hardy Boys/Nancy Drew Mysteries (1977–79)
Hart to Hart (1979–84)
Hawaiian Eye (1959–63)
Hawaiian Heat (1984)
Heart of the City (1986–87)
HeartBeat (1988–89)
High Incident (1996–97)
Hollywood Beat (1985)
Homefront (1991–93)
Honey West (1965–66)
Hooperman (1987–89)
Hotel (1983–88)
Hothouse (1988)
How the West Was Won (1977–79)
How to Get Away with Murder (2014–20)
Human Target (1992)
The Immortal (1970–71)
In Justice (2006)
The Insiders (1985–86)
It Takes a Thief (1968–70)
Jack and Mike (1986–87)
Jack's Place (1992–93)
Karen Sisco (2003–04)
Kevin (Probably) Saves the World (2017–18)
Killer Women (2014)
Kingdom Hospital (2004)
King's Crossing (1982)
Kings Row (1955–56)
Knightwatch (1988–89)
L.A. Dragnet (2003)
Lady Blue (1985–86)
Life as We Know It (2004–05)
Life Goes On (1989–1993)
Life on Mars (2008–09)
Line of Fire (2003–04)
Lottery! (1983–84)
The Love Boat (1977–86)
Lucan (1977–78)
Lucky 7 (2013)
MacGruder & Loud  (1985)
Marcus Welby, M.D. (1969–76)
Masquerade (1983–84)
Matlock (1992–95; moved from NBC)
Matt Helm (1975–76)
Matt Houston (1982–85)
Matt Lincoln (1970–71)
McKenna (1994–95)
MDs (2002)
Men in Trees (2006–08)
Me and Mom (1985)
Mind Games (2014)
Miracles (2003)
Missing (2012)
Missing Persons (1993–94)
Mission: Impossible (1988–90; moved from CBS)
Mistresses (2013–16)
Mobile One (1975)
The Mod Squad (1968–73)
Moonlighting (1985–89)
Moon Over Miami (1993)
The Most Deadly Game (1970–71)
Most Wanted (1976–77)
Motive (2013–14; moved to USA Network)
Muppets Tonight (1996)
Murder One (1995–97)
Murphy's Law (1988–89)
My Generation (2010)
My Life and Times (1991)
My So-Called Life (1994–95)
N.Y.P.D. (1967–69)
Nakia (1974)
Nashville (2012–16; moved to CMT)
The New Breed (1961–62)
The Nine (2006–07)
Notorious (2016)
NYPD Blue (1993–05)
October Road (2007–08)
Of Kings and Prophets (2016)
Off the Map (2011)
Ohara (1987–88)
Once and Again (1999–2002)
Once Upon a Time (2011–18)
Once Upon a Time in Wonderland (2013–14)
Our Family Honor (1985–86)
Owen Marshall: Counselor at Law (1971–74)
Pan Am (2011–12)
Paper Dolls (1984)
Peyton Place (1964–69)
Philly (2001–02)
The Practice (1997–04)
Private Practice (2007–13)
Probe (1988)
Promised Land (2022)
Pros and Cons (1991–92)
Push, Nevada (2002)
Pushing Daisies (2007–09)
Quantico (2015–18)
Queens (2021–22)
The Rat Patrol (1966–68)
Rebel (2021)
Red Widow (2013)
Reef Break (2019)
Relativity (1996–97)
The Renegades (1983)
Revenge (2011–15)
The Roaring 20's (1960–62)
Rookie Blue (2010–15)
The Rookies (1972–76)
Room 222 (1969–74)
S.W.A.T. (1975–76)
Scandal (2012–18)
Scoundrels (2010)
Second Noah (1996–97)
Secrets and Lies (2015–16)
Shadow Chasers (1985–86)
Sidekicks (1986–87)
Six Degrees (2006–07)
The Sixth Sense (1972)
Snoops (1999)
Somewhere Between (2017)
Spenser: For Hire (1985–88)
Spy Game (1997)
Stand By for Crime (1949–50)
Starsky & Hutch (1975–79)
Still Star-Crossed (2017)
Stone (1980)
Straightaway (1961–62)
The Strauss Family (1972)
The Streets of San Francisco (1972–77)
Strike Force (1981–82)
Studio 5-B (1989)
Stumptown (2019–20)
Supercarrier (1988)
Surfside 6 (1960–62)
T. J. Hooker (1982–85)
Take Two (2018)
Ten Days in the Valley (2017–18)
Tenspeed and Brown Shoe (1980)
That Was Then (2002)
Thirtysomething (1987–1991)
Threat Matrix (2003–04)
Today's FBI (1981–82)
Toma (1973–74)
Trauma Center (1983)
Traveler (2007)
Twin Peaks (1990–91)
Ugly Betty (2006–10)
Under Cover (1991)
The Untouchables (1959–63)
The Unusuals (2009)
Vega$ (1978–81)
Vengeance Unlimited (1998–99)
Wasteland (1999)
What About Brian (2006–07)
Whiskey Cavalier (2019)
The Whole Truth (2010)
Wicked City (2015)
Women's Murder Club (2007–08)
Wonderland (2000)
The Wonder Years (1988–93)
The Young Lawyers (1970–71)
Zero Hour (2013)

Science fiction

Western

Sitcoms

Game shows

101 Ways to Leave a Game Show (2011)
The $10,000 Pyramid, later The $20,000 Pyramid (1974–80)
500 Questions (2015–16)
All-Star Blitz (1985)
Bargain Hunters (1987)
Bet on Your Baby (2013–14)
The Better Sex (1977–78)
Big Fan (2017)
The Big Showdown (1974–75)
Blankety Blanks (1975)
Break the Bank (1976)
Bruce Forsyth's Hot Streak (1986)
Camouflage (1961–62)
Card Sharks (2019–21)
The Celebrity Dating Game (2021)
The Chair (2002)
Child Support (2018)
Crash Course (2009)
Dance Machine (2008)
The Dating Game (1965–73)
Don't (2020)
Downfall (2010)
Dream House (1968–70)
Duel (2007–08)
Everybody's Talking (1967)
Family Feud (1976–85; Celebrity edition ran in summer of 2015–present)
The Family Game (1967)
Fun and Fortune (1949)
Funny You Should Ask (1968–69)
Get the Message (1964)
The Girl in My Life (1973–1974)
The Gong Show (2017–18)
The Honeymoon Race (1967)
Hot Seat (1976)
How's Your Mother-in-Law? (1967–68)
The Hustler (2021)
I Survived a Japanese Game Show (2008–09)
Jeopardy! The Greatest of All Time (2020)
Jeopardy! National College Championship (2022)
Karaoke Battle USA (2011)
Let's Make a Deal (1968–76)
Master of Champions (2006)
Match Game (1990–91; 2016–21)
Missing Links (1964)
The Money Maze (1974–75)
Monopoly (1990)
National Bingo Night (2007)
The Neighbors (1975–76)
The Newlywed Game (1966–74; 1984)
Number Please (1961)
The Object Is (1963–64)
One in a Million (1967)
Opportunity Knocks (2008)
Password (1971–75)
The Price Is Right (1963–65)
The Reel Game (1971)
Rhyme and Reason (1975–76)
Second Chance (1977)
Set for Life (2007)
Seven Keys (1961–64)
Shenanigans (1964–65)
Show Me the Money (2006)
Showoffs (1975)
Split Second (1972–75)
Supermarket Sweep (1965–67; 2020–22)
Temptation (1967–68)
Trivia Trap (1984–85)
Wanna Bet? (2008)
Who Do You Trust? (1957–63)
Who Wants to Be a Millionaire (1999–2021)
Wipeout (2008–14) (moved to TBS)
You Deserve It (2011)
You Don't Know Jack (2001)
You Don't Say! (1975)
Yours for a Song (1961–63)

Miniseries

Davy Crockett (1954–55)
QB VII (1974)
Eleanor and Franklin (1976)
Rich Man, Poor Man (1976)
Rich Man, Poor Man Book II (1976)
Washington: Behind Closed Doors (1977)
Roots (1977)
The Young Pioneers (1978)
Pearl (1978)
The Pirate (1978)
Roots: The Next Generations (1979)
Doctors' Private Lives (1979)
East of Eden (1981)
The Manions of America (1981)
Masada (1981)
Kennedy (1983)
The Thorn Birds (1983)
The Winds of War (1983)
Lace (1984)
The Last Days of Pompeii (1984)
Hollywood Wives (1985)
North and South (1985–86; 1994)
Amerika (1987)
Queenie (1987)
Napoleon and Josephine: A Love Story (1987)
War and Remembrance (1988–89)
The Kennedys of Massachusetts (1990)
It (1990)
Son of the Morning Star (1991)
Dynasty: The Reunion (1991)
The Jacksons: An American Dream (1992)
The Tommyknockers (1993)
Wild Palms (1993)
The Stand (1994)
The Langoliers (1995)
James A. Michener's Texas (1995)
Dead Man's Walk (1996)
The Shining (1997)
20,000 Leagues Under the Sea (1997)
Creature (1998)
Storm of the Century (1999)
Mr. Murder (1999)
Anne Frank: The Whole Story (2001)
Dinotopia (2002–03)
Little House on the Prairie (2005)
The Astronaut Wives Club (2015)
Madoff (February 3–4, 2016)
When We Rise (2017)
Women of the Movement (2022)

News programming
20/20 Downtown (1999–2002)
20/20: In an Instant (2015-2017)
Day One (1993–95)
Our World (1986–87)
Primetime (1989–2012)
Primetime Monday (2003)
Turning Point (1994–99)
People's List (2016)
What Would You Do? (2008–20)

Children's animation
The Bugs Bunny Show (October 11, 1960 – August 7, 1962)
Capitol Critters (January 28 – March 14, 1992)
The Flintstones (September 30, 1960 – April 1, 1966)
The Jetsons (September 23, 1962 – March 3, 1963)
Jonny Quest (September 18, 1964 – March 11, 1965)
Matty's Funday Funnies (1959–61)
Matty's Funnies with Beany and Cecil (January 6 – June 30, 1962)
Top Cat (September 27, 1961 – April 18, 1962)

Adult animation
Clerks: The Animated Series (June 7 – May 31, 2000; then to Comedy Central)
The Critic (January 26 – July 20, 1994; then to Fox)
The Goode Family (May 27 – August 7, 2009)

Film presentations
The ABC Sunday Night Movie (April 8, 1962 – August 2, 1998)
ABC Movie of the Week (September 23, 1969 – May 14, 1975)
ABC Theater (December 19, 1972 – 1985)
The ABC Mystery Movie (February 6, 1989 – May 5, 1990)

Specials
The Wild Weird World of Dr. Goldfoot (November 18, 1965)
Alice in Wonderland or What's a Nice Kid Like You Doing in a Place Like This? (March 30, 1966)
The Mad, Mad, Mad Comedians (April 7, 1970)
Hey, Cinderella! (April 10, 1970)
The Night the Animals Talked (December 9, 1970)
Santa Claus Is Comin' to Town (December 14, 1970)
Here Comes Peter Cottontail (April 4, 1971)
A Christmas Carol (December 21, 1971)
The Enchanted World of Danny Kaye: The Emperor's New Clothes (February 21, 1972)
The Cricket in Times Square (April 24, 1973)
A Very Merry Cricket (December 14, 1973)
The Muppets Valentine Show (January 30, 1974)
Fred Astaire Salutes the Fox Musicals (October 24, 1974)
Yes, Virginia, There Is a Santa Claus (December 6, 1974)
The Year Without a Santa Claus (December 10, 1974)
The Missiles of October (December 18, 1974)
Yankee Doodle Cricket (January 16, 1975)
The Muppet Show: Sex and Violence (March 19, 1975)
John Denver's Rocky Mountain Christmas (December 10, 1975)
Charo and the Sergeant (August 24, 1976)
Frosty's Winter Wonderland (December 2, 1976)
Christmas in Disneyland (December 8, 1976)
Rudolph's Shiny New Year (December 10, 1976)
The Easter Bunny Is Comin' to Town (April 6, 1977)
The Making of Star Wars (September 16, 1977)
Halloween Is Grinch Night (October 28, 1977)
Nestor, the Long-Eared Christmas Donkey (December 3, 1977)
'Twas the Night Before Christmas (December 7, 1977)
Why the Bears Dance on Christmas Eve (December 12, 1977)
ABC's Silver Anniversary Celebration (January 31, 1978)
Pat Boone and Family Springtime Special (April 8, 1978)
Mother, Juggs & Speed (August 17, 1978)
The Pink Panther in: A Pink Christmas (December 7, 1978)
The Halloween That Almost Wasn't (October 28, 1979)
Rudolph and Frosty's Christmas in July (November 25, 1979)
John Denver and the Muppets: A Christmas Together (December 5, 1979)
Scooby Goes Hollywood (December 23, 1979)
The Pink Panther in: Olym-Pinks (February 22, 1980)
Pontoffel Pock, Where Are You? (May 2, 1980)
Pinocchio's Christmas (December 3, 1980)
Emmet Otter's Jug-Band Christmas (December 15, 1980)
The Pink Panther in: Pink at First Sight (February 14, 1981)
The Muppets Go to the Movies (May 20, 1981)
Hollywood: The Gift of Laughter (May 16, 1982)
The Grinch Grinches the Cat in the Hat (May 20, 1982)
The Big Easy (August 15, 1982)
Callahan (September 9, 1982)
The Fantastic Miss Piggy Show (September 17, 1982)
Ziggy's Gift (December 1, 1982)
Rocky Mountain Holiday (May 12, 1983)
Olympic Gala (July 28, 1984)
The Cabbage Patch Kids' First Christmas (December 7, 1984)
The Christmas Toy (December 6, 1986)
John Grin's Christmas (December 6, 1986)
A Muppet Family Christmas (December 16, 1987)
The Earth Day Special (April 22, 1990)
Beanpole (July 4, 1990)
Dad's a Dog (July 6, 1990)
Twin Peaks/Cop Rock: Behind the Scenes (September 14, 1990)
An Evening with Friends of the Environment (September 19, 1990)
Hammer, Slammer, & Slade (December 15, 1990)
Dolly Parton: Christmas at Home (December 21, 1990)
The Best of Disney: 50 Years of Magic (May 20, 1991)
Winnie the Pooh and Christmas Too (December 14, 1991)
A Flintstone Family Christmas (December 18, 1993)
Edith Ann: A Few Pieces of the Puzzle (January 18, 1994)
Edith Ann: Homeless Go Home (May 27, 1994)
The Wonderful World of Disney: 40 Years of Television Magic (December 10, 1994)
Peter and the Wolf (December 8, 1995)
Edith Ann's Christmas (Just Say Noël) (December 14, 1996)
Santa vs. the Snowman (December 13, 1997)
A Winnie the Pooh Thanksgiving (November 22, 1998)		
Winnie the Pooh: A Valentine for You (February 13, 1999)
A Rosie Christmas (December 5, 1999)
A Charlie Brown Valentine (February 14, 2002)
Charlie Brown's Christmas Tales (December 8, 2002)
ABC's 50th Anniversary Celebration (May 19, 2003)
Lucy Must Be Traded, Charlie Brown (August 29, 2003)
SOAPnet Salutes ABC Daytime (September 1, 2003)
I Want a Dog for Christmas, Charlie Brown (December 9, 2003)
SOAPnet Reveals ABC Soap Secrets (August 16, 2004 – August 26, 2005)
He's a Bully, Charlie Brown (November 20, 2006)
How the Grinch Stole Christmas! (2006–14)
Lady Gaga and the Muppets Holiday Spectacular (November 28, 2013)
 Live in Front of a Studio Audience (2019)

Reality/non-scripted programming

Those Amazing Animals (1980–81)
That's Incredible! (1980–84)
Fame, Fortune and Romance (1986–87)
Incredible Sunday (1988–89)
Tim Conway's Funny America (1990)
America's Funniest People (1990–94)
Making the Band (2000–01; then to MTV)
The Mole (2001–04; 2008)
Houston Medical (2002)
Extreme Makeover (2002–07)
All-American Girl (2003)
Are You Hot? (2003)
Extreme Makeover: Home Edition (2003–12)
I'm a Celebrity...Get Me Out of Here! (2003)
The Family (2003)
The Real Roseanne Show (2003)
The Benefactor (2004)
Wife Swap (2004–10, 2013)
Supernanny (2005–11)
Dancing with the Stars (2005–21; moved to Disney+)
The Scholar (2005)
Brat Camp (2005)
My Kind of Town (2005)
Miracle Workers (2006)
The One: Making a Music Star (2006)
One Ocean View (2006)
American Inventor (2006–07)
The Ex-Wives Club (2007)
Fast Cars and Superstars: The Gillette Young Guns Celebrity Race (2007)
Fat March (2007)
The Great American Dream Vote (2007)
The Next Best Thing (2007)
Shaq's Big Challenge (2007)
Just For Laughs (2007–09)
Dance War: Bruno vs. Carrie Ann (2008)
High School Musical: Get in the Picture (2008)
Hopkins (2008)
Oprah's Big Give (2008)
Here Come the Newlyweds (2008–09)
Find My Family (2009)
Homeland Security USA (2009)
The Superstars (2009)
Dating in the Dark (July 20, 2009 – September 13, 2010)
Shaq Vs. (August 18, 2009 – August 31, 2010)
True Beauty (January 5, 2009 – July 19, 2010)
Bachelor Pad (2010–12)
Boston Med (June 24, 2010 – August 12, 2010)
Jamie Oliver's Food Revolution (2010–11)
Skating with the Stars (November 22, 2010 – December 21, 2010)
Expedition Impossible (2011)
Take the Money and Run (2011)
Secret Millionaire (2011–13)
Extreme Weight Loss (2011–15)
Ball Boys (2012)
Final Witness (2012)
The Glass House (2012)
Duets (2012)
NY Med (2012–14)
Celebrity Wife Swap (2012–15)
Splash (2013)
Whodunnit? (2013)
The Taste (2013–15)
Rising Star (2014)
Sing Your Face Off (2014)
The Quest (2014; moved to Disney+)
Repeat After Me (2015)
Save My Life: Boston Trauma (2015)
The Great American Baking Show (2015–20)
BattleBots (2015–16)
Beyond the Tank (2015–16)
Boston EMS (2015–16)
Greatest Hits (2016)
My Diet Is Better Than Yours (2016)
Boy Band (2017)
Battle of the Network Stars (1976–88; 2017)
People Icons (2017)
Steve Harvey's Funderdome (2017)
The Toy Box (2017)
The Bachelor Winter Games (2018)
The Last Defense (2018)
The Proposal (2018)
Castaways (2018)
Dancing with the Stars: Juniors (2018)
Videos After Dark (2019)
Family Food Fight (2019)
Kids Say the Darndest Things (2019–20)
The Bachelor Presents: Listen to Your Heart (2020)
The Bachelor: The Greatest Seasons - Ever! (2020)
Emergency Call (2020–21)
Pooch Perfect (2021)
When Nature Calls with Helen Mirren (2021–22)
The Ultimate Surfer (2021)

Saturday morning

A Pup Named Scooby-Doo (September 10, 1988 – August 17, 1991)
ABC Weekend Special (September 10, 1977 – August 30, 1997)
Beetlejuice (September 9, 1989 – October 26, 1991)
Buzz Lightyear of Star Command (October 14, 2000 – September 8, 2001)
Cro (September 18, 1993 – October 22, 1994)
Devlin (September 7 – December 21, 1974)
Disney's Doug (September 7, 1996 – June 26, 1999)
Dragon's Lair (September 8 – December 1, 1984)
Even Stevens (September 15, 2001– September 7, 2002; February 26, 2005 – September 10, 2005)
Everyday Health (2011–12)
Expedition Wild (2013–14)
Fantastic Four (September 9, 1967 – September 21, 1968)
Fantastic Voyage (September 14, 1968 – January 4, 1969)
Flash Forward (1996–97)
Food for Thought (2011–13)
Free Willy (September 24, 1994 – February 25, 1995)
Fudge (January 14, 1995 – March 11, 1995)
Gargoyles: The Goliath Chronicles (September 7, 1996 – February 15, 1997)
George of the Jungle (September 9 – December 30, 1967)
Goldie Gold and Action Jack (September 12 – December 5, 1981)
Goober and the Ghost Chasers (September 8 – December 22, 1973)
Goof Troop (September 19, 1992 – September 11, 1993)
Groovie Goolies (1971–72)
H.E.L.P.! (1979)
Hammerman (September 7, 1991 – 1992)
Hannah Montana (September 9, 2006 – August 27, 2011)
Heathcliff (October 4, 1980 – September 18, 1982)
Hercules (September 12, 1998 – March 13, 1999)
Here Come the Double Deckers (September 12, 1970 –   January 2, 1971)
Hong Kong Phooey (September 7 – December 21, 1974)
Hoppity Hooper (September 12, 1964 – September 2, 1967)
Hot Wheels (September 6, 1969 – September 4, 1971)
House of Mouse (January 13, 2001 – August 24, 2002)
Jabberjaw (September 11 – December 18, 1976)
Jonny Quest (1970–72)
Journey to the Center of the Earth (September 9, 1967 – September 6, 1969)
Jungle Cubs (October 5, 1996 – January 10, 1998)
Junior Almost Anything Goes (September 11, 1976 – September 4, 1977)
Kid Power (September 16, 1972 – September 1, 1974)
Kim Possible (September 14, 2002 – September 2, 2006)
Korg: 70,000 B.C. (September 7, 1974 – August 30, 1975)
Krofft Supershow (September 11, 1976 – September 2, 1978)
Lancelot Link, Secret Chimp (September 12, 1970 – January 2, 1971)
Land of the Lost (September 7, 1991 – December 5, 1992)
Lassie's Rescue Rangers (November 11, 1972 – December 22, 1973)
Laverne & Shirley in the Army (October 10, 1981 – November 13, 1982)
Lidsville (September 11, 1971 – September 8, 1973)
Lilo & Stitch: The Series (September 20, 2003 – September 2, 2006)
Little Clowns of Happytown (September 26, 1987 – July 16, 1988)
Little Rosey (September 8 – December 22, 1990)
Lloyd in Space (February 3, 2001 – September 7, 2002)
Madeline (September 16, 1995 – September 14, 1996)
Mary-Kate and Ashley in Action! (October 27, 2001 – August 3, 2002)
Menudo on ABC (1983–85)
Mickey Mouse Works (September 12, 1998 – January 6, 2001)
Mighty Ducks (September 21, 1996 – September 6, 1997)
Mighty Morphin Power Rangers (January 2, 2010 – August 28, 2010)
Mighty Orbots (September 8 – December 15, 1984)
Milton the Monster (October 9, 1965 – September 8, 1968)
Mission: Magic! (September 8 – December 22, 1973)
Monchhichis (September 10 – December 3, 1983)
Mork & Mindy/Laverne & Shirley/Fonz Hour (September 25, 1982 – September 3, 1983)
My Pet Monster (September 12 – December 19, 1987)
NBA Inside Stuff (September 7, 2002 – August 28, 2004)
New Kids on the Block (September 8 – December 14, 1990)
Nightmare Ned (April 19 – August 9, 1997)
Ocean Mysteries with Jeff Corwin (2011–16)
Ocean Treks with Jeff Corwin (2016)
One Saturday Morning (September 13, 1997 – September 7, 2002)
Outback Adventures with Tim Faulkner (October 4, 2014 – September 30, 2017)
The Oz Kids (September 14 – November 9, 1996)
Pac-Man (September 25, 1982 – November 5, 1983)
Pepper Ann (September 13, 1997 – September 8, 2001)
Phil of the Future (September 25, 2004 – September 2, 2006)
Pound Puppies (September 13, 1986 – December 19, 1987)
Power Rangers (September 14, 2002 – August 28, 2010)
Power Rangers Wild Force (September 14, 2002 – February 8, 2003)
Power Rangers Ninja Storm (February 15, 2003 – February 14, 2004)
Power Rangers Dino Thunder (February 21, 2004 – February 12, 2005)
Power Rangers S.P.D. (February 26, 2005 – March 4, 2006)
Power Rangers Mystic Force (March 11, 2006 – February 24, 2007)
Power Rangers Operation Overdrive (March 3, 2007 – March 22, 2008)
Power Rangers Jungle Fury (March 22, 2008 – February 28, 2009)
Power Rangers RPM (March 7, 2009 – December 26, 2009)
Quack Pack (1996–97)
ReBoot (1994–95)
Recess (September 13, 1997 – August 28, 2004)
Recipe Rehab (April 2, 2012 – July 25, 2015)
Richie Rich (November 8, 1980 – September 1, 1984)
Rocky and His Friends (1959–61; 1964–73)
Rubik, the Amazing Cube (September 17 – December 10, 1983)
Sabrina: The Animated Series (September 11, 1999 – October 20, 2001)
Schoolhouse Rock! (January 6, 1973 – September 2, 2000)
Science Court (September 13, 1997 – January 17, 1998)
Scooby-Doo and Scrappy-Doo (September 22, 1979 – January 5, 1980)
Scooby's All-Star Laff-A-Lympics (September 10, 1977 – October 28, 1978)
Sea Rescue (2012–18)
Skyhawks (September 6, 1969 – September 4, 1971)
Sonic the Hedgehog (1993–94, re-ran until 1995)
Spider-Man (September 9, 1967 – August 30, 1969)
Spider-Woman (September 22, 1979 – January 5, 1980)
Squigglevision (September 12, 1998 – January 22, 2000)
Star Wars: Droids (September 7, 1985 – June 7, 1986)
Super Friends (September 8, 1973 – September 6, 1986)
Tales from the Cryptkeeper (September 18, 1993 – December 10, 1994)
Teacher's Pet (September 9, 2000 – September 7, 2002)
Teamo Supremo (January 19, 2002 – September 13, 2003)
That's So Raven (September 20, 2003 – August 27, 2011)
The 13 Ghosts of Scooby-Doo (September 7 – December 7, 1985)
The ABC Saturday Superstar Movie (September 9, 1972 – November 17, 1973)
The Addams Family (September 14, 1992 – November 6, 1993)
The Adventures of Gulliver (September 14, 1968 – January 4, 1969)
The Adventures of Winnie the Pooh (1980)
The All-New Pink Panther Show (September 9, 1978 – December 23, 1978)
The Beatles (September 25, 1965 – October 21, 1967)
The Brady Kids (September 9, 1972 – October 6, 1973)
The Bugs Bunny Show (August 1962 – September 8, 1968; September 8, 1973 - August 30, 1975; September 7, 1985 – September 2, 2000)
The Buzz on Maggie (September 17, 2005 – January 21, 2006)
The Care Bears Family (September 13, 1986 – October 31, 1987)
The Cattanooga Cats (September 6, 1969 – September 5, 1971)
The Emperor's New School (January 28, 2006 – August 27, 2011)
The Flintstone Kids (September 6, 1986 – May 21, 1988)
The Fonz and the Happy Days Gang (November 8, 1980 – November 28, 1981)
The Funky Phantom (September 11, 1971 – January 1, 1972)
The Great Dr. Scott (2018–19)
The Great Grape Ape Show (September 6 – December 13, 1975)
The Hardy Boys (September 6 – December 27, 1969)
The Jackson 5ive (September 11, 1971 – October 14, 1972)
The Jetsons (1963–64)
The King Kong Show (September 10, 1966 – August 31, 1969)
The Legend of Tarzan (July 13, 2002 – September 7, 2002)
The Littles (September 10, 1983 – November 2, 1985)
The Lost Saucer (September 6 – December 20, 1975)
The Magilla Gorilla Show (1966–67)
The Monkees (1972–73)
The Mumbly Cartoon Show (September 11, 1976 – September 3, 1977)
The New Adventures of Gilligan (September 7, 1974 – October 18, 1975)
The New Adventures of Winnie the Pooh (September 17, 1988 – September 7, 2002)
The New Casper Cartoon Show (October 5, 1963 – January 30, 1970)
The New Scooby and Scrappy-Doo Show (September 10, 1983 – December 10, 1983)
The New Scooby-Doo Mysteries (September 8, 1984 – December 1, 1984)
The Oddball Couple (September 6 – December 20, 1975)
The Osmonds (September 9 – December 23, 1972)
The Pirates of Dark Water (February 25, 1991 – December 7, 1991)
The Plastic Man Comedy/Adventure Show (September 22, 1979 – February 28, 1981)
The Porky Pig Show (September 20, 1964 – September 2, 1967)
The Proud Family (August 31, 2002 – September 2, 2006)
The Puppy's Further Adventures (September 25, 1982 – November 10, 1984)
The Real Ghostbusters (September 13, 1986 – October 5, 1991)
The Reluctant Dragon & Mr. Toad Show (September 12 – December 26, 1970)
The Replacements (September 9, 2006 – August 27, 2011)
The Scooby-Doo/Dynomutt Hour (September 11 – December 18, 1976)
The Suite Life of Zack & Cody (September 17, 2005 – August 27, 2011)
The Tom and Jerry Show (September 6 – December 13, 1975)
The Weekenders (February 26, 2000 – September 8, 2001)
The Wildlife Docs (2013–18)
The Wizard of Oz (September 8 – December 28, 1990)
The Wuzzles (1986–88)
These Are the Days (September 7, 1974 – September 27, 1975)
Thundarr the Barbarian (October 4, 1980 – October 31, 1981)
Top Cat  (1962–63)
Turbo Teen (September 15, 1984 – August 31, 1985)
Uncle Croc's Block (September 6, 1975 – February 14, 1976)
Vacation Creation (2017–19)
W.I.T.C.H. (January 15, 2005 – March 26, 2005)
What-a-Mess (1995–96)
Wild West C.O.W.-Boys of Moo Mesa (September 12, 1992 – December 4, 1993)
Will the Real Jerry Lewis Please Sit Down (September 12, 1970 – September 2, 1972)
Wolf Rock TV (September 8 – October 20, 1984)
Yogi's Gang (September 8 – December 29, 1973)

Soap operas

Sports
ABC's Wide World of Sports (1961–98)
Arena Football League (1998–2002, 2007–08)
The Baseball Network (1994–95)
Monday Night Baseball (1976–88)
Monday Night Football (1970–2005)
NHL on ABC (1993–94, 2000–04)
Professional Bowlers Tour (1962–97)
Rose Bowl Game (1989–2010)
Thursday Night Baseball (1989)

Sunday morning
Animals, Animals, Animals (1976–81)
Beany and Cecil (1964–67 reruns)
The Adventures of Rocky and Bullwinkle and Friends (1964–73 reruns)
Dudley Do-Right (1969–70 reruns)
Issues and Answers (1960–81)
Kids Are People Too (1978–82)
Linus the Lionhearted (1966–69 reruns)
Make a Wish (1971–76)
Peter Potamus (1966–68 reruns)

Talk shows
The Joey Bishop Show (April 17, 1967 – December 26, 1969)
Bachelor in Paradise: After Paradise (August 3, 2015 – September 6, 2016)
Caryl & Marilyn: Real Friends (June 10, 1996 – May 30, 1997)
The Chew (September 26, 2011 – June 28, 2018)
Good Afternoon America (July 9 – September 7, 2012)
Home (January 18, 1988 – April 8, 1994)
Mike and Maty (April 11, 1994 – June 7, 1996)
Politically Incorrect (January 1997–June 5, 2002; previously on Comedy Central July 25, 1993–January 1997)
The Dick Cavett Show (1968–75; 1986)
The Revolution (January 16 – July 6, 2012)
The Steve Allen Show (1961)
Bachelor Live (2016)
The Alec Baldwin Show (2018)

Variety series

American Bandstand (1957–87)
The Brady Bunch Hour (1976–77)
Buzzy Wuzzy (1948)
Captain & Tennille (1976–77)
Cos (1976)
The Dana Carvey Show (1996)
Dolly (1987–88)
Donny & Marie (1976–79)
Dot Comedy (2000)
The Eddy Arnold Show (1956)
The Frank Sinatra Show (1957–58)
Fridays (1980–82)
The Grand Ole Opry (1955–56)
The Hollywood Palace (1964–70)
Into The Night Starring Rick Dees (July 23, 1990 – September 21, 1991)
The Jim Stafford Show (1975)
The Johnny Cash Show (1969–71)
The Julie Andrews Hour (1972–1973)
Just for Laughs (2009–11)
The King Family Show (1965–66; 1969)
The Lawrence Welk Show (1955–71)
The Lennon Sisters Hour (1969-1970)
The Mickey Mouse Club (1955–59)
Ozark Jubilee (1955–60)
The Paula Poundstone Show (1993)
Showtime U.S.A. (1950–51)
The Sonny Comedy Revue (1974)
Talent Varieties (1955)
This Is Tom Jones (1969–71)
Trust Us with Your Life (2012)
Turn-On (1969)
The Wayne Brady Show (2001–02)
Where the Action Is (1965–67)
Whose Line Is It Anyway? (1998–2004)

Television films

Other
ABC Afterschool Special (October 4, 1972 – January 23, 1997)
Battle of the Network Stars (November 13, 1976 – December 10, 1988)
Confession (1957 – January 13, 1959)
Conflict (September 18, 1956 – September 3, 1957)
Disneyland/The Wonderful World of Disney (1954–61; 1986–88; 1997–2008)
Ripley's Believe It or Not (September 26, 1982 – February 6, 1986)
Warner Bros. Presents (September 20, 1955 – May 22, 1956)
Your Witness (September 19, 1949 – 1950)

See also
 List of television films produced for American Broadcasting Company

References

 
ABC